The 1978–79 New Orleans Jazz season was their fifth season in the NBA and its last in New Orleans. The Jazz averaged 108.3 points per game (ranked 15th in NBA) while allowing an average of 114.6 points per game (ranked 21st in NBA). The attendance was 364,205 (ranked 18th in NBA).

Draft picks

Regular season

Season standings

Record vs. opponents

Player stats
Note: GP= Games played; REB= Rebounds; AST= Assists; STL = Steals; BLK = Blocks; PTS = Points; AVG = Average

Relocation to Utah
By 1979, the Jazz were sinking under the weight of $5 million in losses over five years. Original owner Sam Battistone decided to move to Salt Lake City, even though it was a smaller market than New Orleans at the time. However, Salt Lake City had proven it could support a pro basketball team when it played host to the American Basketball Association's Utah Stars from 1970 to 1976.

Professional basketball returned to New Orleans, when the Charlotte Hornets relocated there, in 2002.  The team became the Pelicans in 2013 season, and the 1988-2002 history of the Hornets returned to the Bobcats, who reinstated the Hornets name prior to the 2014–15 season.

References

 Jazz on Basketball Reference

Utah Jazz seasons
New Orleans
New Orl
New Orl